The position of Speaker of the Inatsisartut (the Greenlandic Parliament) was created in 1979. 
The preceding office was Chairman of the Landsråd of Greenland.

List of speakers of the Greenlandic Parliament
Below is a list of office-holders:

References and footnotes

Politics of Greenland
Greenland, Inatsisartut
Government of Greenland